Athletics at the 2014 Asian Games was held in Incheon, South Korea from 27 September to 3 October 2014. A total of 47 events were contested, 24 by men and 23 by women - matching the Olympic athletics programme. The 42 track and field events on the programme were hosted at the Incheon Asiad Main Stadium, while the road competitions took place around the city's marathon and racewalking course.

Schedule

Medalists

Men

Women

Medal table

Participating nations
A total of 654 athletes from 41 nations competed in athletics at the 2014 Asian Games:

References

Daily reports
Minshull, Phil (2014-09-27). Mohammed gets the 2014 Asian Games athletics off to a historic start. IAAF. Retrieved on 2014-10-03.
Minshull, Phil (2014-09-28). Ogunode sets area 100m record of 9.93 at the Asian Games. IAAF. Retrieved on 2014-10-03.
Minshull, Phil (2014-09-29). Barshim battles tiredness but still triumphs with Asian Games record in Inchon. IAAF. Retrieved on 2014-10-03.
Minshull, Phil (2014-09-30). Hadadi's discus hat-trick makes Iran happy at the Asian Games. IAAF. Retrieved on 2014-10-03.
Mulkeen, Jon (2014-10-01). Records and rules broken in 800m finals at Asian Games. IAAF. Retrieved on 2014-10-03.
Mulkeen, Jon (2014-10-02). Two Asian records broken on fantastic day for China at the Asian Games. IAAF. Retrieved on 2014-10-03.
Mulkeen, Jon (2014-10-03). Marathon debutant Mahbood wins Asian Games title. IAAF. Retrieved on 2014-10-03.

External links
Official website

 
Athletics
2014
Asian Games
2014 Asian Games